High Hopes may refer to:

Film and television
High Hopes (1988 film), a 1988 British film
High Hopes (2006 film), a 2005 U.S. film
High Hopes (Canadian TV series), a Canadian soap opera
High Hopes (British TV series), a British situation comedy

Music

Albums and EPs
High Hopes (album), a 2014 album by Bruce Springsteen, or its title song (see below)
High Hopes (EP), a 2007 EP by The Amity Affliction

Songs
"High Hopes" (Frank Sinatra song), 1959
"High Hopes" (The S.O.S. Band song), 1982
"High Hopes" (Tim Scott McConnell song), 1987
"High Hopes" (Pink Floyd song), 1994
"High Hopes" (Kodaline song), 2013
"High Hopes" (Panic! at the Disco song), 2018
"High Hopes", a song by Sammy Hagar from Unboxed
"High Hopes", a song by Neil Halstead from Sleeping on Roads